11-Ketotestosterone (11-KT) is an oxidized form of testosterone that contains a keto group at the C11 position. It is related to adrenosterone, an androgen found in trace quantities in humans. In fish, 11-ketotestosterone functions as the endogenous androgenic sex hormone. In midshipman fish, 11-ketotestosterone is not present in females or Type II Males — Type II Males reach sexual maturation later, are less territorial, and have higher testosterone than Type I Males.

In mammals, 11-ketotestosterone has similar potency to testosterone as an androgen, and has been identified as an important adrenal androgen. However, unlike testosterone, it is very weakly anabolic and mostly prevents muscle breakdown as opposed to promoting muscle growth. It is synthesized from 11β-hydroxyandrostenedione and, to a lesser extent, 11-ketoandrostenedione (adrenosterone). 11-Ketoandrostenedione has notably been sold online as an androgen prohormone, usually under the name 11-oxoandrostenedione (11-OXO).

See also
 Testosterone
 11β-Hydroxytestosterone

References

Secondary alcohols
Androgens and anabolic steroids
Androstanes
Hormones of the suprarenal cortex
Ketones
Sex hormones
Steroid hormones